Morfotikos Tymbou is a Cypriot association football club based in Tymbou, located in the Nicosia District. It has 1 participation in Cypriot Fourth Division (1992–93 Cypriot Fourth Division).

References

Football clubs in Cyprus